James Blackwood (1919–2002) was an American Gospel music singer.

James Blackwood may also refer to:

James Blackwood, 2nd Baron Dufferin and Claneboye (1755–1836)
James Blackwood, prisoner on the St. Michael of Scarborough
James Douglas Blackwood (1881–1942), doctor and officer in the United States Navy, namesake of the USS J. Douglas Blackwood